The 2012 McMurry War Hawks football team represented McMurry University in the 2012 NCAA Division II football season. The War Hawks, transitioning to Division II and Lone Star Conference (LSC) membership, competed as an independent and provisional Division II member. They played a mixed schedule of schools from the FCS, NAIA, and D-II. McMurry competed in the Division II postseason via the LSC's bid to the C.H.A.M.P.S. Heart of Texas Bowl.

Schedule

Personnel

Roster

References

McMurry
McMurry War Hawks football seasons
McMurry War Hawks football